Legazpi station is the current railway terminus of the South Main Line located in Albay, Philippines. It is also the terminus for the Legaspi-Tabaco branch line. The station is currently used for the Bicol Commuter rail.

History
Legazpi was opened in November 1914 as part of the Legazpi Division Line from Tabaco, Albay to Iriga, Camarines Sur. The pebbled station building was built in 1939 after the completion of the Manila-Legazpi Line.

The series of on and off operations of services can be dated back since 1941 during the arrival of the Japanese, rail tracks were destroyed as ordered by the USAFFE, interrupting services, the Japanese Imperial Army restored services on March 22, 1943, but to be halted again due to heavy damages brought by the liberation, services were once again restored on December 21, 1948.

The location of the railroad at the foot of Mayon Volcano often cause landslide and lahar floods which interrupt services. One was in 1976; services were restored on February 23, 1986. Operations stopped again from February 2, 1993 due to the eruption of the Mayon Volcano; services were again restored on June 21, 1998 until the bridge at Travesia, Guinobatan was washed away in 2006.

The platform right side was raised in 2015 for the Bicol Commuter services.

Former Connecting Lines
A spur track used to connect the station to the Legazpi Port. A proof of this is an image of the area during the Japanese Occupation where a railroad crossing sign is visible and located beyond the station building.

The Tabaco line, which was originally part of the Legazpi Division line, was abandoned in 1936.

Philippine National Railways stations
Railway stations in Albay
Buildings and structures in Legazpi, Albay